Holy is In Strict Confidence's fifth studio album. The box set includes: Holy album CD, bonus CD with exclusive instrumental track "Alpha Omega", six postcards and three stickers. The album reached #83 on the German national charts.

Track listing

EPs
Seven Lives

References

External links 
 

2004 albums
In Strict Confidence albums